The Franklin H. Walker House was a private residence located at 2730 East Jefferson Avenue in Detroit, Michigan. It was also known as Doctor's Hospital. The house was listed on the National Register of Historic Places in 1985, but subsequently demolished in 1998. It was at the time the largest remaining house along Jefferson Avenue.

Description

The Franklin H. Walker House was a two-and-one-half-story structure, constructed of brown brick and rock-faced limestone. The massive Neo-Jacobean house was irregular in both floorplan and in height. A medieval-influenced octagonal tower with a pointed roof projected from one corner of the house; at the other corner, a two-story, three-sided bay window unit projected from the main bulk of the house. The gable roof was covered with tiles; walls at the gable ends terminated in fractables.

History and significance
This home was built in 1896 for Franklin H. Walker, a son of Hiram Walker and president of the Hiram Walker Distillery. Walker hired George D. Mason to design the house. The house was notable for its immense size, diverse building materials, and medieval motif.

The house was eventually converted into a hospital, and extensively remodeled and added on to. The house was used until 1980 as Doctor's Hospital. It was demolished in 1998.

References

Houses in Detroit
Hospitals in Michigan
Demolished buildings and structures in Detroit
Former houses in the United States
Houses completed in 1896
Buildings and structures demolished in 1990
Houses on the National Register of Historic Places in Michigan
National Register of Historic Places in Detroit
Jacobean architecture in the United States
Victorian architecture in Michigan
Gilded Age mansions